Dorji Khandu is a Bhutanese politician who has been a member of the National Council of Bhutan, since May 2018.

Education
He holds a Bachelor of Engineering in Civil Engineering and a Master of Engineering in Civil Engineering (WREM).

References 

Members of the National Council (Bhutan)
1980s births
Living people